The Siskiyou Arts Council served Siskiyou County, California, USA as the official arts council until its dissolution in 2015.

The Siskiyou Arts Council ran under the California state arts council, the California Arts Council (CAC).

Arts councils of California
Siskiyou County, California